The Kuwait Food Company, doing business as the Americana Group, is a Kuwaiti food company headquartered in Sharjah City. It operates food products throughout the Middle East and North Africa region, Americana Group is the largest integrated food company in Middle East.

Until 2016, it was listed on the Kuwait Stock Exchange.

History
In 1970, Americana first opened Wimpy in Kuwait. During the 1970s, Americana Meat was introduced in the market which included chicken nuggets, hamburgers, chicken fillets and more.

Americana Group's main lines of business are operating food and beverage outlets, and manufacturing of food products. It has a network of over 1,200 outlets. The group’s network encompasses several brands in the quick service, casual dining and fine dining categories,some of which are KFC, Pizza Hut, Hardee's, T.G.I. Friday's, Costa Coffee, Baskin Robbins, Krispy Kreme, Olive Garden, Red Lobster, and LongHorn Steakhouse.

Operating countries
Americana's currently has 23 restaurant chains in 13 countries.

Africa

 
 
Asia

References

1964 establishments in Kuwait
Food and drink companies established in 1964
Companies listed on the Boursa Kuwait
Companies based in the Emirate of Sharjah